The Fen Line is a railway line in the east of England that links  in the south to  in the north. The line runs through Cambridgeshire and Norfolk and the name of the line refers to the Fens which border Cambridgeshire, Norfolk and Lincolnshire.

The line is part of the Network Rail Strategic Route 5 and comprises SRS 05.06 and part of 05.05. It is classified as a secondary line except between Cambridge and  where it is classified as a London and South East commuter line.

History
The line was completed in sections in the 1840s, and previously extended north to the seaside town of Hunstanton.

Services

Great Northern

These services are mostly operated by Class 387 electric multiple units. Before May 2017, Class 365s were the principal units.

Three Class 365 EMUs received names associated with the line:
The Fenman (365518) – previously a "named train" that used to operate on this line, consisting of locomotive-hauled InterCity (British Rail) trains;
Robert Stripe Passengers' Champion (365527) was named on 10 March 2006, after the 21st Anniversary of the Fen Line Users Association;
Nelson's County (365531) had a special livery applied to the outside which shows various scenes of West Norfolk however this was removed when Great Northern took over First Capital Connect.

Greater Anglia
Class 755 units are used for this service.

These services operate only run during the morning and evening peaks, and use Class 720 units.

CrossCountry
Class 170 units are used for this service.

Signalling
The line is double tracked except between Littleport and Downham Market and between Watlington and King's Lynn where it is bi-directionally signalled single track. In the Down direction, the entrance to the single line sections is protected additionally by SPAD indicators.

Signal boxes controlling the line are;
Cambridge power box
Littleport
Downham Market
Magdalen Road (Watlington)
King's Lynn

The signalling system is Track circuit block with multiple aspect colour light signals- with the exception of:
one semaphore signal at King's Lynn which controls entry to the One Train In Section freight-only line from King's Lynn to 
two semaphore shunt signals at  station
On 19/11/2020, the Department of Transport announced funding to renew the Signalling on the Fen Line to ETCS Cab Signalling.

Infrastructure
Traction current for electric trains is provided by 25 kV AC OHLE controlled by Romford Electrical Control Room. There are Neutral Sections at Shepreth Branch junction, Milton Fen and just north of Littleport bypass. The line has a loading gauge of W8 except for the section connecting the Ipswich–Ely line to the Ely–Peterborough line, which is W10.

Passenger volume
These are the statistics of the numbers of passengers on the line from the year beginning April 2002 to the year beginning April 2017. Comparing each station between the first and last years (14 years total), King's Lynn has increased by 68%, Watlington by 133%, Downham Market by 111%, Littleport by 157%, Ely by 113%, Waterbeach by 149% and Cambridge by 109%. Cambridge North did not open at the publication of these previous figures.

References

Further reading

External links

Fen Line Users Association (FLUA)
Norfolk Railway Society

Rail transport in Cambridgeshire
Rail transport in Norfolk
Railway lines in the East of England
King's Lynn and West Norfolk
Rail transport in Cambridge